Lukáš Opiela (born 13 January 1986) is a Slovak professional footballer who plays as a defensive midfielder for Skalica. Outside of Slovakia, he worked at the club level in the Czech Republic and Italy.

External links
 
 
 Player profile on fkmb.cz 
 Player profile on fotbalportal.cz 

1986 births
Living people
Slovak footballers
Association football midfielders
ŠK Futura Humenné players
FC Fastav Zlín players
FK Mladá Boleslav players
FK Senica players
MFK Skalica players
A.C.N. Siena 1904 players
Czech First League players
Serie C players
Expatriate footballers in the Czech Republic
Sportspeople from Humenné
2. Liga (Slovakia) players